Australia's Got Talent is an Australian reality television show, based on the original UK series, to find new talent. The seventh season aired on the Nine Network from 11 August 2013 until 10 November 2013. Kyle Sandilands returned as a judge for his fourth season, and was joined by Dawn French, Timomatic and Geri Halliwell, as well as Julia Morris as the new host. Halliwell, French and Timomatic who is the additional fourth judge replaced original judge Dannii Minogue and Brian McFadden, while Morris replaced Grant Denyer. It was the first time that the show aired on another network, following its axing from the Seven Network in October 2012. The auditions took place from March–April 2013.

Season Overview

In October 2012, original host Grant Denyer confirmed he would not return to the show. In November and December 2012, it was also confirmed that Dannii Minogue, Brian McFadden and Kyle Sandilands would all not return to the judging panel following the show's reboot. Nine stated that it was looking for a "fresh, new panel", ruling out original judge Minogue who had sat on the panel since the show's debut in 2007. This was the first season in the show's history to feature four judges.

On 17 March 2013, it was announced that Melanie Brown of Spice Girls would replace Minogue as a judge. A day later, it was announced that comedian Dawn French would replace McFadden on the panel. On 19 March 2013, it was announced that former participant Tim Omaji, otherwise known as Timomatic, had signed up to the panel. On 20 March 2013, it was announced that Sandilands would return to reprise his role on the panel despite constant rumours that he would be leaving the show. Later that day, Julia Morris was confirmed as the host of the new season.

On 20 March 2013, it was reported that Seven, the show's former network, had won a legal injunction preventing Brown from signing onto any shows airing on Nine until 31 January 2014, thus putting her role on the show in doubt. Producers were forced to look for a new fourth judge after a Supreme Court judge ruled that the injunction preventing Brown from working for any Australian network other than Seven was to remain in place. On 29 April 2013, Nine confirmed that Geri Halliwell would replace Brown as the fourth judge.

This season's judges table and X's on the stage looked identical to the ones on Britain's Got Talent. In addition, the sound of the fourth judge's buzzer sounded identical to the one on America's Got Talent when an act had been buzzed out, while the others' sounded identical to the ones on Britain's Got Talent.

Auditions
In December 2012, it was announced that the auditions would take place from March 2013. There were various options for auditioning, such as attending the correct venue on the correct day with the questionnaire (which could be found on the website or completed on audition day), sending a DVD in with the act on it, or applying online. The following list contains all of the cities, venues and dates of the auditions. The auditions took place from  March–April  2013.

Semi-finalists

Semi-final summary
 Buzzed Out |  Judges' choice
 |  |

Semi-final 1

Semi-final 2

Semi-final 3

Semi-final 4

Semi-final 5

Semi-final 6

Finals summary

Ratings

References

Australia's Got Talent
2013 Australian television seasons